The M34 is a French sailboat that was designed by Joubert/Nivelt/Mercier as a one-design racer and first built in 2010. The boat was used as the class for the Tour de France à la voile.

Production
The design was built by Archambault Boats in France from 2010 until 2013, but it is now out of production.

Design
The M34 is a racing keelboat, built predominantly of fibreglass with a sandwiched core. It has a 7/8 fractional sloop rig with a carbon fibre keel-stepped mast and fixed bowsprit, and an aluminum boom. The mast has two sets of 20° swept spreaders. The hull has a plumb stem, a raised plumb transom, an internally mounted spade-type rudder controlled by a tiller and a fin keel. It displaces  and carries  of lead ballast.

The design has sleeping accommodation for four people, in two cabins. The below decks headroom is 

Operational history
The boat served as the one-design class for the Tour de France à la voile from 2011 to 2014.

See also
List of sailing boat types

References

External links

Archambault M34 video Walkthrough
Archambault M34 video sailing in high winds

Keelboats
2010s sailboat type designs
Sailing yachts
Sailboat type designs by Joubert-Nivelt
Sailboat types built by Archambault Boats
Tour de France à la voile